John Morris (1 July 1940 – 26 October 2011) was a South African cricketer. He played eight first-class matches for Western Province between 1961 and 1963.

References

External links
 

1940 births
2011 deaths
South African cricketers
Western Province cricketers
Cricketers from Cape Town